Iheb Mbarki (born 14 February 1992) is a Tunisian footballer who plays as a right back for Espérance Sportive de Tunis and formerly played for Evian Thonon Gaillard in Ligue 1.

References 

1992 births
Living people
Tunisian footballers
Association football defenders
CA Bizertin players
Ligue 1 players
Thonon Evian Grand Genève F.C. players
Espérance Sportive de Tunis players
Tunisia A' international footballers
2011 African Nations Championship players
Expatriate footballers in France
Tunisian expatriate sportspeople in France
Tunisian expatriate footballers
2016 African Nations Championship players